Pledgie was a donation website created by Mark Daggett and Garry Dolley that ran on the Ruby on Rails web application framework. The creators have also worked on Revver.com and decided to create Pledgie after meeting each other there and discovering that both had an interest for open source software and the Ruby language.

The site allowed anyone to make a pledge for just about any type of cause. Donations were received through the user's PayPal account. Causes could have a set ending time and users could set the money goal for the pledge. The goal might also be left empty. Anyone could comment on a cause whether they have donated or not, and the pledge owner could respond to these comments, but not remove them.

While the website aimed for the funding of health, safety and other causes that can help the community, the majority of pledges were listed under "Internet", "Programming Languages" and "Uncategorized".

The website has been discontinued in January 2018.

History
Pledgie was created in 2007 by Daggett and Dolley who wanted to make an open and transparent donations website. Daggett claimed that he had been working in homeless shelters and realized that several nonprofits have no shortage of volunteers, but a shortage of funds.

Their first "real" campaign was the pledge they created for the Mephisto project. Mephisto is a blog publishing system created by Rick Olson and Justin Palmer that also runs under the Ruby on Rails framework and is similar to WordPress. The pledge was used as a test-drive for Pledgie, although the Mephisto project already had a PayPal donation button. They asked for the users on Mephisto's IRC channel #mephisto, to make donations to them via Pledgie and the goal was met overnight. Mephisto was also used by Pledgie for their blog.

Pledges
Pledgie has been very widely used by GitHub, having around 2260 total pledges as of July 2009 and around 5230 as of June 2010 due to their proprietary Pledgie integration system used on GitHub's website. The Pledgie integration system had been explained in posts on the GitHub and Pledgie blogs. Pledgie has also been used by The Freesound Project and Inkscape as their main donation service.

Pledgie has gained popularity for pledges set up by friends or family members of victims of tragedies and over the amount of money the pledges had earned. $70,000 was raised for a pledge set up by a Utah-based blogger to help the family of Clay Sannar, who was murdered in a shooting.

Interface
The Pledgie interface is simple and has some similarities to social bookmark sites such as Digg. One similarity to Digg is the yellow pledge counter placed next to each cause showing how many pledges have been made, which are very similar to Digg's yellow Digg counters.

Since 2010,  Pledgie used Google AdSense for revenue, but instead now takes 3% of all donations.

References

External links
 Official website

American companies disestablished in 2018
American companies established in 2007
American fundraising websites
Internet properties disestablished in 2018
Internet properties established in 2007
Ruby (programming language)